Monohelea is a genus of flies belonging to the family Ceratopogonidae.

The genus has cosmopolitan distribution.

Species:
 Ceratopogon clunipes (Loew, 1850) 
 Monohelea accipiter Debenham, 1972

References

Ceratopogonidae